Schneller is a lunar impact crater on the Moon's far side. It is located in the northern latitudes to the southwest of the crater Woltjer. This is a heavily worn and eroded crater that has a somewhat uneven rim with outward bulges to the southeast and northeast. The rim is nearly non-existent along the northwestern side. The interior of this crater is relatively featureless, with only a few small, indistinct craterlets.

Satellite craters
By convention these features are identified on lunar maps by placing the letter on the side of the crater midpoint that is closest to Schneller.

References

 
 
 
 
 
 
 
 
 
 
 
 

Impact craters on the Moon